The Cardinal is a 1963 American drama film produced independently, directed by Otto Preminger and distributed by Columbia Pictures. The screenplay was written by Robert Dozier, based on the novel of the same name (1950) by Henry Morton Robinson. The music score was written by Jerome Moross.

The film's cast features Tom Tryon, Romy Schneider and John Huston, and it was nominated for six Academy Awards. It marks the final appearance by veteran film star Dorothy Gish as well as the last big-screen performance of Maggie McNamara.

The film was shot on location in Rome, Vienna, Boston and Stamford, Connecticut.

Robinson's novel was based on the life of Francis, Cardinal Spellman, who was then Archbishop of New York. The Vatican's liaison officer for the film was Rev. Dr. Joseph Ratzinger, later to become Pope Benedict XVI. The story touches on various social issues such as interfaith marriage, sex outside marriage, abortion, racial bigotry, the rise of fascism and war.

Plot 

The film is shown as a series of memory flashbacks during a formal ceremony where the protagonist is instituted as a cardinal.

A newly ordained Irish Catholic priest, Stephen Fermoyle (Tom Tryon), returns home to Boston in 1917. He discovers that his parents are upset about daughter Mona (Carol Lynley) having become engaged to marry a Jewish man, Benny Rampell (John Saxon). Stephen and his Irish Catholic family will only permit Mona to marry Benny if he becomes a Catholic or agrees to raise any children as Catholic. Benny does not agree and leaves to serve in World War I. Mona seeks Stephen's counsel as a priest. After he tells her to give Benny up, she runs away and becomes promiscuous.

Concerned about the young priest's ambition, the archbishop (John Huston) assigns Stephen to an out-of-the-way parish where it is hoped that he will learn humility. There he meets the humble pastor, Father Ned Halley (Burgess Meredith), and Fermoyle observes the unpretentious way in which he lives his life and treats his parishioners. Father Halley is very sick with multiple sclerosis. Fermoyle learns humility from him and his housekeeper, Lalage (Jill Haworth).

Meanwhile, Mona becomes pregnant out of wedlock. Stephen, his brother and Benny find Mona in agony because her pelvis is too small for a large baby. She is taken to the hospital, where the doctor tells Stephen that it is too late to perform a caesarean operation and in order to save Mona, the head of the baby must be crushed. Stephen will not allow the doctor to do so, because according to Catholic doctrine, the baby may not be killed. Mona dies giving birth to the child, Regina.

Racked with guilt over the death of his sister, Stephen suffers a crisis of faith, so he is transferred to Europe and made a monsignor, but he is unsure of how committed he is to a life in the clergy, and he travels to Vienna, taking a two-year sabbatical by working as a lecturer. There he meets and enters into a relationship with a young woman, Annemarie (Romy Schneider). Stephen does not violate his vows.

Stephen's vocation calls him back to Rome and the church. The Vatican returns him to the United States on a mission in the American South to assist a black priest named Father Gillis (Ossie Davis) who is opposed by the Ku Klux Klan. After successfully handling the assignment, Stephen is consecrated as a bishop, with Father Gillis present for the consecration.

Stephen is sent back to Austria to persuade a cardinal not to cooperate with the Nazi government, with a threat of a world war looming over all. He and the cardinal ultimately must flee for their lives. He manages to see Annemarie one last time after she has been imprisoned by the Nazi authorities. After the success of the missions on which the Vatican had sent him, he is elevated to the College of Cardinals.

On the eve of World War II, a ceremony is held in which Stephen formally becomes a cardinal. He warns about the dangers of totalitarianism and pledges to dedicate the rest of his life to his work.

Cast

 Tom Tryon as Stephen Fermoyle
 Carol Lynley as Mona Fermoyle / Regina Fermoyle
 Dorothy Gish as Celia Fermoyle
 Maggie McNamara as Florrie Fermoyle
 Bill Hayes as Frank Fermoyle
 Cameron Prud'Homme as Din Fermoyle
 Romy Schneider as Annemarie von Hartmann
 Peter Weck as Kurt von Hartmann
 Cecil Kellaway as Monsignor Monaghan
 Ossie Davis as Father Gillis
 Loring Smith as Cornelius J. Deegan
 John Saxon as Benny Rampell
 James Hickman as Father Lyons
 Berenice Gahm as Mrs Ramble
 John Huston as Cardinal Glennon
 Jose Duvall (as Jose Duval) as Ramon Gongaro
 Peter MacLean as Father Callahan
 Robert Morse as Bobby and His Adora-Belles
 Burgess Meredith as Father Ned Halley
 Josef Meinrad as Cardinal Innitzer
 Erik Frey as Seyss-Inquart
 Wolfgang Preiss as SS major
 Jill Haworth as Lalage Menton
 Raf Vallone as Cardinal Quarenghi
 Tullio Carminati as Cardinal Giacobbi 
 Arthur Hunnicut as Sheriff Dubrow
 Chill Wills as Monsignor Whittle

Background 
The script was credited to Robert Dozier, but featured uncredited contributions by Ring Lardner, Jr., who worked with Preminger in developing characterizations and story structure. Saul Bass was not only responsible for designing the film's poster and advertising campaign, but also the film titles, during which Bass transforms a walk through the Vatican into an abstract play of horizontal and vertical lines.

Release
The film was the first to be shown in 70 mm despite being shot in 35 mm for some roadshow releases, using a "print-up" ("blow up") process.

Reception

Box-office performance
The Cardinal was the 18th highest-grossing film of the year. It grossed $11,170,588 in the United States, earning $5.46 million in domestic rentals.

Critical reception 
On Rotten Tomatoes, the film has an approval rating of 50% based on 14 reviews, with an average rating of 6/10.

Awards
The film won the Golden Globe for Best Motion Picture Drama, marking the third time, following East of Eden (1955) and Spartacus (1960), and the last time, that a film won that category without later being nominated for the Academy Award for Best Picture. Preminger was nominated for an Academy Award for Best Director and John Huston was nominated for an Academy Award for Best Supporting Actor and won the Golden Globe Award for Best Supporting Actor – Motion Picture. Huston's role as Cardinal Glennon was his official debut as an actor, although he had previously played bit roles in several films, including his own The Treasure of the Sierra Madre (1948). Other Academy Award nominations were those for Best Cinematography (Leon Shamroy), Best Art Direction (Lyle R. Wheeler and set decorator Gene Callahan), Best Costume Design (Donald Brooks) and Best Film Editing (Louis R. Loeffler).

Honors
The film was nominated by the American Film Institute for its AFI's 100 Years of Film Scores list.

Preservation
The Cardinal was preserved by the Academy Film Archive in 2012.

See also

List of American films of 1963

References

External links
 
 
 
 

1963 drama films
1963 films
American drama films
Best Drama Picture Golden Globe winners
Films featuring a Best Supporting Actor Golden Globe winning performance
Films about Catholicism
Films about Catholic priests
Films based on American novels
Films directed by Otto Preminger
Films scored by Jerome Moross
Films set in Boston
Films set in the 1910s
Films set in the 1920s
Films set in the 1930s
Films set in Vatican City
Films shot in Massachusetts
Films shot in Rome
Films shot in Vienna
Films with screenplays by Ring Lardner Jr.
Columbia Pictures films
1960s English-language films
1960s American films